Alnus cordata, the Italian alder, is a tree or shrub species belonging to the family Betulaceae, and native to the southern Apennine Mountains (Campania, Basilicata and Calabria, mainly on western mountain sides) and the north-eastern mountains of Corsica. It has been introduced in Sicily, Sardinia, and more recently in Central-Northern Italy, other European countries (France, Belgium, Spain, Portugal, United Kingdom) and extra-European countries (Chile, New Zealand), where it has become naturalised.

Description

The small winged seeds disperse through the winter, leaving the old woody, blackish 'cones' on the tree for up to a year after.

It has three natural growing shapes. 1) Along rivers with room to grow and plenty of water one base will often give rise to four to six stems, which fan out at some ten degrees from vertical. 2) In open meadows near rivers, marshy ground and flooding can cause trees to angle or tilt over, whereupon over a matter of seasons they grow natural bends to return the upper trunk to vertical.  It is not uncommon to find cordatas with S shapes arising from two tilting events.  3) In groves of multiple trees they grow thinner and straighter, such that a grove of a 100 trees can be an excellent renewable source of straight timber good for woodwork.

Cultivation
Like other alders, it is able to improve soil fertility through symbiotic nitrogen fixation with the bacteria Actinomyces alni (Frankia alni). It thrives on much drier soils than most other alders, and grows rapidly even under very unfavourable circumstances, which renders it extremely valuable for landscape planting on difficult sites such as mining spoil heaps and heavily compacted urban sites. It is commonly grown as a windbreak.

Alnus cordata has gained The Royal Horticultural Society's Award of Garden Merit.

Bonsai
The Italian Alder makes a medium to large bonsai, a quick grower it responds well to pruning with branches ramifying well and leaf size reducing quite rapidly.

Other uses
The tree also produces valuable reddish-orange wood. It breaks down when exposed to alternating dry and damp air, but is highly durable when kept wet or dry.  As demonstrated in the construction of Venice, when immersed in water it lasts for centuries.  Also when used within condensation-free, temperature and humidity controlled buildings it has a reputation for maintaining a smooth and naturally shiny finish. The timber is liked by carpenters and used for turning and carving, for moulding, furniture, panelling and plywood.

References

External links

 Alnus cordata - distribution map, genetic conservation units and related resources. European Forest Genetic Resources Programme (EUFORGEN)

cordata
Trees of Europe
Flora of Albania
Flora of Corsica
Flora of Sardinia
Flora of Sicily
Plants described in 1810
Garden plants of Europe
Plants used in bonsai
Ornamental trees